Kurt Rocco (born October 8, 1987) is a former American football quarterback who played for the Cleveland Gladiators and New Orleans VooDoo of the Arena Football League (AFL). He played college football at the University of Mount Union

College career
Rocco attended the University of Mount Union in Alliance, Ohio. He was a starting quarterback for the Raiders, leading them to the 2009 NCAA Division III National Championship game. During his career, he threw for 42 touchdowns, 3,929 yards, and a completion percentage of 70.9.

Professional career

Cleveland Gladiators
After going undrafted in the 2010 NFL Draft, Rocco signed with the Cleveland Gladiators of the Arena Football League. He was the backup to John Dutton to begin the 2011 season, when Dutton tore his Achilles tendon in the team's season opener. Rocco had 72 passing and 13 rushing touchdowns, with a 112.64 quarterback rating, as he guided the Gladiators to the AFL East Division Championship, and a Playoff berth in 2011.

New Orleans VooDoo
Rocco was assigned to the New Orleans VooDoo for the 2012 season. He had his best career stats in 2012, with 107 passing and 7 rushing touchdowns, with a 115.40 quarterback rating, as he helped the VooDoo clinch an AFL Playoff berth in 2012. Rocco played two more seasons (2013-14), finishing his AFL career with the Voodoo in 2014. 
Rocco had a quarterback rating of 108.5 in his four seasons in the Arena Football League.

Statistics

Stats from ArenaFan:

References

1987 births
Living people
Players of American football from Cincinnati
American football quarterbacks
Mount Union Purple Raiders football players
Cleveland Gladiators players
New Orleans VooDoo players